Nasratullah Zadran (born 1 January 2002) is an Afghan cricketer. He made his first-class debut for Kandahar Province in the 2018–19 Mirwais Nika Provincial 3-Day tournament on 7 March 2019. He made his List A debut for Boost Region in the 2019 Ghazi Amanullah Khan Regional One Day Tournament on 12 September 2019.

References

External links
 

2002 births
Living people
Afghan cricketers
Boost Defenders cricketers
Place of birth missing (living people)